Myst is a graphic adventure designed by the Miller brothers, Robyn and Rand. It was developed by Cyan, Inc., published by Broderbund, and initially released in 1993 for the Macintosh. In the game, the player travels via a special book to a mysterious island called Myst. From there, solving puzzles allows the player to travel to other worlds ("Ages"), which reveal the backstory of the game's characters and help the player make the choice of whom to aid. The player interacts with objects and walks to different locations by clicking on pre-rendered imagery.

Myst marked a segue for the Miller brothers from the kid's games market to adult-targeted games. They wanted to create a graphically-impressive game with a nonlinear story and mystery elements. The game's design was limited by the small memory footprint of consoles (the original intended platform for the game) and by the slow speed of CD-ROM drives. The game was created on Macintosh computers and ran on the HyperCard software stack, though ports to other platforms subsequently required the creation of a new engine.

The game was a critical and commercial success. Critics lauded the ability of the game to immerse players in its fictional world; it has since been considered one of the best video games ever made. Selling more than six million copies, Myst became the best-selling PC game until The Sims exceeded its sales in 2002. Myst helped drive adoption of the CD-ROM drive, spawned a multimedia franchise, and inspired clones, parodies, and new video game genres, as well as spin-off novels and other media. The game has been rereleased and remade using real-time 3D graphics.

Gameplay

Mysts gameplay consists of a first-person journey through an interactive world. Players can interact with specific objects on some screens by clicking or dragging them. The player moves by clicking on locations shown on the screen; the scene then crossfades into another frame, and the player can explore the new area. Myst has an optional "Zip" feature to assist in rapidly crossing areas already explored; when a lightning bolt cursor appears, players can click and skip several frames to another location. While this provides a rapid method of travel, it can also cause players to miss important items and clues. Some items can be carried by the player and read, including journal pages which provide backstory. Players can only carry a single page at a time, and pages return to their original locations when dropped.

To complete the game, the player must fully explore the island of Myst. There, the player discovers and follows clues to be transported via "linking books" to several "Ages", each of which is a self-contained mini-world. Each of the Ages—named Selenitic, Stoneship, Mechanical, and Channelwood—requires the user to solve a series of logical, interrelated puzzles to complete its exploration.  Each Age must be explored to solve the game's primary puzzle on Myst.

Apart from its predominantly nonverbal storytelling, Mysts gameplay is unusual among adventuring computer games in several ways. The player is provided with very little backstory at the beginning of the game, and no obvious goals or objectives are laid out. This means that players must simply begin to explore. There are no obvious enemies, no physical violence, no time limit to complete the game, and no threat of dying at any point. The game unfolds at its own pace and is solved through a combination of patience, observation, and logical thinking.

Plot
Players assume the role of an unnamed person who stumbles across an unusual book titled "Myst". The player reads the book and discovers a detailed description of an island world called Myst. Placing their hand on the last page, the player is whisked away to the world described and is left with no choice but to explore the island. Myst contains a library where two additional books can be found, colored red and blue. These books are traps that hold Sirrus and Achenar, the sons of Atrus, who once lived on Myst island with his wife Catherine. Atrus writes special "linking books" that transport people to the worlds, or "Ages", that the books describe. From the panels of their books, Sirrus and Achenar tell the player that Atrus is dead; each brother blames the other for the death of their father, as well as the destruction of much of Atrus' library. Both plead for help to escape. The books are missing several pages, rendering the sons' messages unclear and riddled with static.

As the player continues to explore the island, books linking to more Ages are discovered hidden behind complex mechanisms and puzzles. The player must visit each Age, find the red and blue pages hidden there, and return to Myst Island. These pages can then be placed in the corresponding books. As the player adds more pages to these books, the brothers can be seen and heard more clearly. After collecting four pages, the brothers can talk clearly enough to tell the player where the fifth and final missing page for their book is hidden; if the player can complete either book, that brother will be set free. The clearer dialog also allows the player to more accurately judge each brother's personality. The player is left with a choice to help Sirrus, Achenar, or neither.

Sirrus and Achenar beg the player not to touch the green book that is stored in the same location as their final pages, claiming it to be another trap book like their own. In truth, it leads to D'ni, where Atrus is imprisoned. When the book is opened, Atrus asks the player to bring him a final page that is hidden on Myst Island; without it, he cannot bring his sons to justice. The game has several endings, depending on the player's actions. Giving either Sirrus or Achenar the final page of their book causes the player to switch places with the son, leaving the player trapped inside the Prison book. Linking to D'ni without the page Atrus asks for leaves the player and Atrus trapped on D'ni. Linking to D'ni with the page allows Atrus to complete his Myst book and return to the island. Upon returning to the library, the player finds the red and blue books gone, and burn marks on the shelves where they used to be.

Development

Background

In 1988, brothers Rand and Robyn Miller were living apart in the United States. Robyn was taking a year off from university, writing and trying to establish state residency. Rand was a computer programmer for a bank. Rand approached his brother with the idea of making an interactive storybook using HyperCard. The brothers were not big video game players themselves, although they were familiar with Dungeons & Dragons, and had played Zork. In his parents' basement—Robyn did not own a computer himself—Robyn began drawing pictures and creating a nonlinear story that would eventually become their first game, The Manhole. The Manhole and the games that followed—Cosmic Osmo and Spelunx—were specifically aimed at children and shared the same aesthetics: black-and-white graphics, point-and-click gameplay, a first-person point of view, and explorable worlds. Robyn recalled that the games were more about exploration than narrative: "In the projects we did for children, we didn't really tell stories ... They were just these worlds that you would explore."

Around 1990, the brothers decided to create a game that would appeal to adults. Among their goals were believable characters, a non-linear story, and for the player as protagonist to make ethical choices. The Millers pitched the game to Activision under the title The Gray Summons; Robyn recalled that Activision told them to stick to children's games. At the time of the rejection, they were not doing well financially—"we were eating rice and beans and government cheese and that [was] our diet." Facing the end of their game-producing career, Japanese developer Sunsoft approached the Millers to create an adult-oriented game. Like with The Gray Summons, the Millers wanted their game to have a non-linear story with believable characters and an ethical choice. They also wanted to produce a game with far more impressive graphics than their previous efforts—at one point they considered making the game entirely hand-drawn. Finally, they knew their story would be a mystery.

Development of Myst began in 1991. The game's creative team consisted of brothers Rand and Robyn, with help from sound designer Chris Brandkamp, 3D artist and animator Chuck Carter, Richard Watson, Bonnie McDowall, and Ryan Miller, who together made up Cyan, Inc. Myst was the largest and most time-consuming collaboration Cyan had attempted at that point. Cyan took inspiration from games like Zork, Star Wars mythic universe, portals to other worlds like in C. S. Lewis' The Chronicles of Narnia, and the mysterious islands of old literature like the works of Jules Verne. The game's name, as well as the overall solitary and mysterious atmosphere of the island, was inspired by the book The Mysterious Island by Verne.

Sunsoft was not interested in the PC market and was focused on the video game console market instead. At the time, consoles had no hard drives and small memory buffers, meaning the game had to be designed around these technical constraints. To solve this issue, they compartmentalized parts of the game's environments into the different Ages. The Millers decided that most people did not like puzzles. Thus, a good puzzle would feel familiar and part of the world—not like a puzzle, but something for players to figure out like a circuit breaker in their house, using observation and common sense. Cyan did not have fans to please, and did not know exactly who the game would appeal to; Robyn felt like they did not have to second-guess their choices and could "explore the world as we were designing" and build a game for themselves. In a 2016 interview, Rand Miller stated that they strived to design the puzzles in Myst and their subsequent games by trying to balance three aspects: the puzzles themselves, the environment, and the story. Rand also stated they wanted to make sure that clues to the solutions to puzzles were apparent and presented to the player in a manner for these connections to be made: "once the player finds the solution, if they blame us, then we haven't done a good job. But if they blame themselves, then we have."

The Millers prepared a seven-page game proposal for Sunsoft from their ideas, mostly consisting of maps of the islands they had envisioned. Cyan proposed Myst to Sunsoft for $265,000—more than double what they thought it would cost to develop the game, but ultimately less than the game's final cost. Sunsoft had asked the brothers if their game would be as good as the upcoming The 7th Guest, another CD-ROM video game that had been shown in public preview demonstrations; the Millers assured them it would. After getting the go-ahead, Cyan playtested the entire game in a role-played Dungeons and Dragons form to identify any large issues before entering full production.

Production

Myst was not only the largest collaboration Cyan had attempted at the time but also took the longest to develop. According to Rand Miller, the brothers spent months solely designing the look and puzzles of the Ages, which were influenced by earlier whimsical "worlds" made for children. Much of the early development time was spent devising puzzles and the Ages, and the story was secondary. "We were place designers ... and the maps kind of fueled the story," Rand said. The plot evolved in tandem with the changing environment, developing new story details with each new building in the world. The climactic ending with Atrus was a later development in the game's story after Cyan realized they wanted to create a more complicated ending. In retrospect, Robyn felt that Myst did not quite provoke the emotional reaction and ethical quandary they set out to create.

The game was created on Macintosh computers, principally the Macintosh Quadra 700, using the HyperCard software. One of the first major discoveries Cyan had was how effective 3D rendering software was compared to hand-drawn figures that they had used on their previous titles, making it easy to create the worlds of Myst. Additionally, 3D rendering allowed them to use color, something lacking from their previous titles. Robyn generally focused on rendering out the environment using StrataVision 3D, with some additional modeling in Macromedia MacroModel, while Rand would place those images into HyperCard to link them up and test the puzzle aspects. Overall, Myst contains 2,500 frames, one for each possible area the player can explore. Final images for the game were then edited and enhanced using Photoshop 1.0.

In addition to the indoor settings, Myst featured exterior environments for each Age. At first, the developers had no idea how they would actually create the physical terrain for the Ages. Eventually, they created grayscale heightmaps, extruding them to create changes in elevation. From this basic terrain, textures were painted onto a colormap which was wrapped around the landscapes. Objects such as trees were added to complete the design. Rand noted that attention to detail allowed Myst to deal with the limitations of CD-ROM drives and graphics, stating "A lot can be done with texture ... Like finding an interesting texture you can map into the tapestry on the wall, spending a little extra time to actually put the bumps on the tapestry, putting screws in things. These are the things you don't necessarily notice, but if they weren't there, would flag to your subconscious that this is fake."

When Cyan began development, developing believable characters was a major hurdle. The brothers were limited to one-way communication with the player, and at any point, a player could choose to walk away and "break the spell" of the game. Displaying video in the game was initially infeasible. Designing around the limits, the designers created the trap books, which were location-specific, one-way communication devices. The release of QuickTime halfway through development of the game solved the video issue.

The original HyperCard Macintosh version of Myst had each Age as a unique HyperCard stack. Navigation was handled by the internal button system and HyperTalk scripts, with image and QuickTime movie display passed off to various plugins; essentially, Myst functions as a series of separate multimedia slides linked together by commands. The main technical constraint that impacted Myst was slow CD-ROM drive read speeds—few consumers had anything faster than single-speed drives, limiting the speed of streaming data off the disc. Cyan had to go to great lengths to make sure all the game elements loaded as quickly as possible. Images were stored as 8-bit PICT resources with custom color palettes and QuickTime still image compression. Animated elements such as movies and object animations were encoded as QuickTime movies with Cinepak compression; in total, there were more than 66 minutes of Quicktime animation. This careful processing made the finished graphics look like truecolor images despite their low bit depth; the stills were reduced in size from 500 KB to around 80 KB. The Millers tried to allocate files on the physical location of the spiral track on the CD in a manner as to reduce the seek time for images and movies that were closely related as to reduce any apparent in-game delay as the player transitions from scene to scene.

Cyan playtested the game with two people sitting in front of the game, finding that they would converse with each other and vocalize their likes and dislikes compared to one person silently playing. Rand and Robyn sat behind the testers taking notes, and could make on-the-fly changes and fixes. Cyan wanted the interface of the game to be invisible, and to craft a game that a wide audience would enjoy. Early on they had decided that there would be no inventory, enemies, or ways to die; eventually, they included a save system as a concession to the fact that it would take most players months to complete the game. Among the problems testers discovered with the story was that Myst initially had no inciting incident. In response, Cyan added a note from Atrus to Catherine that clued players in to the existence of a chamber by the dock that played a message from Atrus and explained the game's objectives.

Audio
Chris Brandkamp produced most of the ambient and incidental sounds in the game. To make sure the sounds fit, Brandkamp had to wait until the game's visuals were placed in context. Sound effects were drawn from unlikely sources; the noise of a fire in a boiler was created by driving slowly over stones in a driveway because recordings of actual fire did not sound like fire burning. The chimes of a large clock tower were simulated using a wrench, then transposed to a lower pitch. For the bubbles, which he recalled as "the most hateful sound", was created from the bubbles in the toilet using various tubes blown.

At first, Myst had no music, because the Millers did not want music to interfere with the gameplay. After a few tests, they realized that the background music did not adversely affect the game, alluding to Super Mario Bros. In fact, "seemed to really help the mood of certain places that you were at in the game." Robyn Miller ended up composing 40 minutes of synthesized music that was used in the game and later published as Myst: The Soundtrack. Mixing and effects were done on an E-mu Proteus MPS synthesizer. The soundtrack was recorded over the course of two weeks' evenings. Initially, Cyan released the soundtrack via a mail-order service, but before the release of Mysts sequel, Riven, Virgin Records acquired the rights to release the soundtrack, and the CD was re-released on April 21, 1998.

Sales
Myst was an immense commercial success. Along with The 7th Guest, it was widely regarded as a killer application that accelerated the sales of CD-ROM drives. Rand Miller recalled thinking before the game's release that selling 100,000 copies would be "mind-blowing". Broderbund sold 200,000 copies of the Macintosh version in six months after its September 1993 debut; such sales would have been enough to make it a best-selling PC game, and were extraordinary in the much smaller Macintosh market. Although requiring a CD drive further reduced the potential market, the difficulty of software piracy for CD-ROM software before CD burners became popular also helped sales. The game sold 500,000 copies in its first year.

Broderbund began porting Myst to Windows immediately after the Macintosh version's debut. This required the development of a new game engine, Mohawk, because HyperCard was not available in Windows. In March 1994, Myst was released for Windows, a much larger market. The game sold more than 500,000 copies in 1994, and more than one million copies of the game were sold by spring 1995; even a strategy guide written in three weeks sold 300,000 copies. Unusually for a video game, sales continued to increase: 850,000 copies in the United States in 1996, and 870,000 in 1997. U.S. sales decreased to 540,000 copies in 1998, but the growing popularity in Europe of multimedia PCs increased sales there. Unlike other early CD-ROM games, Myst did not depend on full motion video which was of poor quality at the time, so its graphics remained appealing long after release. By April 1998, Myst had sold 3.82 million units and earned $141.7 million in revenue in the United States. This led PC Data to declare it the country's best-selling computer game for the period between January 1993 and April 1998. Myst sold more than 6.3 million units worldwide by 2000, including more than 4.3 million in the United States; the figures exclude bundled software sales with multimedia upgrade kits.

Myst was the bestselling PC game throughout the 1990s until The Sims exceeded its sales in 2002, and was the top-selling game in the US for a total of 52 months between March 1994 and April 1999.

Reception

Myst was generally praised by critics. Computer Gaming World assured its readers that the game was not like other CD-ROM games that were "high on glitz and low on substance ... Myst is everything it's touted to be and is, quite simply, the best [Macintosh] CD-ROM game". It praised the game's open-world nature, lack of death, and "straightforward and simple" storyline. The magazine stated that the "mesmerizing" and "stunning" graphics and sound were "not the star of the show ... the substance of the game is every bit as good as its packaging", and concluded that Myst "is bound to set a new standard". In April 1994, the magazine called it an "artistic masterwork". Jeff Koke reviewed Myst in Pyramid #8 (July/August 1994), and stated that "It is the first adventure game in which I left feeling as though I had visited a real place."

Wired and The New York Times were among the publications that pointed to Myst as evidence that video games could, in fact, evolve into an art form. Entertainment Weekly reported that some players considered Mysts "virtual morality" a religious experience. Aarhus University professor Søren Pold pointed to Myst as an excellent example of how stories can be told using objects rather than people. Laura Evenson, writing for the San Francisco Chronicle, pointed to adult-oriented games like Myst as evidence the video game industry was emerging from its "adolescent" phase.

GameSpot's Jeff Sengstack wrote that "Myst is an immersive experience that draws you in and won't let you go." Writing about Mysts reception, Greg M. Smith noted that Myst had become a hit and was regarded as incredibly immersive despite most closely resembling "the hoary technology of the slideshow (with accompanying music and effects)". Smith concluded that "Mysts primary brilliance lies in the way it provides narrative justification for the very things that are most annoying" about the technological constraints imposed on the game; for instance, Macworld praised Mysts designers for overcoming the occasionally debilitating slowness of CD drives to deliver a consistent experience throughout the game. The publication went on to declare Myst the best game of 1994, stating that Myst removed the "most annoying parts of adventure games—vocabularies that [you] don't understand, people you can't talk to, wrong moves that get you killed and make you start over. You try to unravel the enigma of the island by exploring the island, but there's no time pressure to distract you, no arbitrary punishments put in your way".

Some aspects of the game still received criticism. Several publications did not agree with the positive reception of the story. Jeremy Parish of 1UP.com noted that while its lack of interaction and continual plot suited the game, Mysts helped end the adventure game genre. Edge stated the main flaw with the game was that the game engine was nowhere near as sophisticated as the graphics. Heidi Fournier of Adventure Gamers noted a few critics complained about the difficulty and lack of context of the puzzles, while others believed these elements added to the gameplay. (The game is so difficult that Broderbund included a blank pad of paper for taking notes. The Miller brothers estimate that half or less of players left the starting island.) Similarly, critics were split on whether the lack of a plot the player could actually change was a good or bad element. In 1996 Next Generation called Myst "gaming's bleakest hour", saying the static graphics and purely trial-and-error puzzles epitomized poor game design. The magazine said its commercial success, which they owed chiefly to its popularity among non-gamers as a CD-ROM showcase, had led to many other games emulating its negative aspects. In a 2000 retrospective review, IGN declared that Myst had not aged well and that playing it "was like watching hit TV shows from the 70s. 'People watched that?,' you wonder in horror."

Myst was named Best Adventure/Fantasy Role-Playing Game at the 1994 Codie awards, and received an honorable mention in Electronic Entertainments 1993 "Breakthrough Game" category, which ultimately went to The 7th Guest. That magazine's editors wrote, "One of the best-looking, best-sounding games ever, the Macintosh version of Myst sets new standards for the effective use of CD-ROM." Myst was also a runner-up for Computer Gaming Worlds 1993 "Adventure Game of the Year" award, but lost to Gabriel Knight: Sins of the Fathers and Day of the Tentacle (tie). In 1996, the magazine ranked Myst 11th on its list of the most innovative computer games.

Reviews for the game's console ports generally reflected each critic's attitude towards the original game, as critics agreed that the ports for 3DO, Saturn, and PlayStation are virtually identical to the PC original. For example, Sushi-X of Electronic Gaming Monthly gave the 3DO version a 5 out of 10, remarking "The graphics and sounds are decent but the game never really appealed to me on the PC", while his co-reviewer Danyon Carpenter gave it a 7 out of 10 and assessed that "This game was all the rage when it debuted on the PC, and that excitement should follow through on the 3DO." In one of the more enthusiastic reviews for Myst, GamePro gave the 3DO version a perfect 5 out of 5 in all four categories (graphics, sound, control, and funfactor), concluding, "Beautiful and enchanting, Myst will thrill you and make you think at the same time." The Jaguar CD version was largely ignored by reviewers, but GamePro commented that apart from the Jaguar CD's lack of a mouse peripheral and occasionally longer load times, this version too is identical to the PC original.

However, the 3DS version received negative reviews even from critics who felt that Mysts popularity was merited, citing graphics and audio well below the 3DS's capabilities and the use of awkward circle pad controls in lieu of the 3DS's touchscreen.

Legacy
Mysts achievements led to a number of games which sought to copy its success, referred to as "Myst clones". Its success baffled some, who wondered how a game that was seen as "little more than 'an interactive slide show'" turned out to be a hit. As early as December 1994, Newsweek compared Myst to "an art film, destined to gather critical acclaim and then dust on the shelves".

Some developers of adventure games concurrent to Mysts release were critical of its success, due to the number of subsequent video games that copied Mysts style compared to traditional adventure games. These games diluted the market with poorly-received clones and were perceived as contributing to the decline of the genre. Others criticized Myst as the "ultimate anti-arcade game", as it was much more relaxed and casual than anything that was released since 1972, as "there were no lives, no dying, no score, and no time limit. No physical agility or reflexes were required. The only pressure was that which you imposed upon yourself to solve the puzzles and complete the storyline." However, Myst, along with other published works using the CD-ROM format, had created a new way of thinking about presentation in video games due to the nature of the CD-ROM: whereas most games before could be viewed as "games of emergence", in which game elements combined in novel and surprising ways to the player, Myst demonstrated one of the first "games of progression" where the player is guided through predefined sets of encounters. This helped to provide alternative experiences atypical of usual video games, and subsequently helped to validate the arthouse approach used in many indie video games developed in the 2000s.

Mysts success led to several sequels. Riven was released in 1997 and continues Mysts storyline, with Atrus asking the player to help him rescue his wife Catherine. Presto Studios and Ubisoft developed and published Myst III: Exile  in 2001, Myst IV: Revelation was developed and published entirely by Ubisoft and released in 2004. The latest game in the franchise is Myst V: End of Ages, developed by Cyan Worlds and released in 2005. In addition to the main games, Cyan developed Uru: Ages Beyond Myst. The multiplayer component of Uru was initially canceled, but GameTap eventually revived it as Myst Online: Uru Live. After Uru Live was cancelled, the game was released as an open source title. The Miller brothers collaborated with David Wingrove to produce several novels based on the Myst universe, which were published by Hyperion. The novels, entitled Myst: The Book of Atrus, Myst: The Book of Ti'ana, and Myst: The Book of D'ni, fill in the games' backstory and were packaged together as The Myst Reader. By 2003, the Myst franchise had sold over twelve million copies worldwide, with Myst representing more than six million copies in the figure.

Myst became a cultural touchstone of the day; the game was so popular the Miller brothers appeared in advertisements for The Gap.  Actor Matt Damon wanted The Bourne Conspiracy video game to be a puzzle game like Myst, refusing to lend his voice talent to the game when it was turned into a shooter instead. Myst has also been used for educational and scientific purposes; Becta recognized a primary school teacher, Tim Rylands, who had made literacy gains using Myst as a teaching tool, and researchers have used the game for studies examining the effect of video games on aggression. A parody computer game, Pyst, was released in 1996; the game is a satirical free roam of Myst island which had been apparently vandalized by frustrated visitors. Starring John Goodman, the parody cost far more to develop than the original. Myst was added to the collection of video games of the Museum of Modern Art in 2013, where it is displayed as a video presentation.

In retrospective, Myst is considered to be a precursor to casual games that gained popularity with browser platforms and mobile devices which typically do not require players to act quickly, as well as a preliminary example of a walking simulator that allow players to explore and discover the game's narrative at their own pace. Cyan's sequels to Myst also indirectly served to popularize escape the room games, which provide similar puzzle-solving experiences but in a much more confined space.

Disney approached Cyan Worlds about constructing a theme park inspired by Myst, which included scouting an island area within Disney's Florida properties that Rand Miller felt was perfect for the Myst setting. The television streaming service Hulu had obtained the rights to create a television series around Myst in May 2015. The series would explore the origin of the main island featured in Myst. The Hulu series was to be produced by Legendary Television, which had acquired the television rights from Cyan for the series in late 2014. The show was to have been produced by Matt Tolmach and written by Evan Daugherty. Rand Miller stated in a September 2016 interview that with the show, "we're farther along now than we've been in a long time", but timelines remain uncertain.

In June 2019, Village Roadshow Pictures announced they had acquired the rights to make Myst films, television programs, and other programming, leaving the fate of the Legendary Television vehicle in doubt. Ashley Edward Miller was announced as the showrunner and writer for the show's pilot.

Remakes and ports
Mysts success for Mac and Windows PCs led to the game being ported to multiple platforms, including the Saturn, PlayStation, Jaguar CD, AmigaOS, CD-i and 3DO consoles. A version for the Sega CD was developed and previewed by Sunsoft, but was not released.

An updated version of the game, Myst: Masterpiece Edition was released in May 2000. It features several improvements over the original game's multimedia: the images are re-rendered in 24-bit truecolor instead of the original Mysts 256 colors (8-bit); the score was remastered, and sound effects were enhanced.

RealMyst: Interactive 3D Edition is a remake developed by Cyan and Sunsoft and published by Ubisoft in November 2000 for Windows PCs, and in January 2002 for Mac. Unlike Myst and Masterpiece Edition, the gameplay of realMyst features free-roaming, real-time 3D graphics instead of point-and-click pre-rendered stills. Weather effects like thunderstorms, sunsets, and sunrises were added to the Ages, and minor additions were made to keep the game in sync with the story of the Myst novels and sequels. The game also added a new sixth Age called Rime, which is featured in an extended ending. While the new interactivity of the game was praised, realMyst ran poorly on most computers of the time. Robyn Miller expressed frustration with realMyst, saying that despite the marketing, it was not how they had originally envisioned Myst. Carla Harker reviewed the PC version of the game for Next Generation, rating it one star out of five, and stated that "With only graphics to stand on, realMYST is beautiful, but there's no real substance here."

 realMyst: Masterpiece Edition is a visually enhanced revision running on the Unity engine that also includes the graphics of the original Myst game. It was released on Windows and macOS on February 7, 2014. The remake was updated to version 2.0 on January 28, 2015, receiving a significant graphical overhaul in which several bugs were fixed and the detail of many models and textures was upgraded.

Console and handhelds
On May 18, 2012, the PlayStation version of Myst was released on the Playstation Network as a PSone Classic for the PlayStation 3 and PSP.

In November 2005, Midway Games announced that they would be developing a remake of Myst for the PlayStation Portable. The remake would include additional content that was not featured in the original Myst, including the Rime Age that was earlier seen in realMyst. The game was released in Japan and Europe in 2006, and the US version was released in 2008.

A version of Myst for the Nintendo DS was also released in December 2007. It features remastered video and audio, using source code specifically re-written for the Nintendo DS. The remake features Rime as a playable Age, with an all-new graphics set. This version of the game was released in Europe on December 7, 2007, courtesy of Midway. It was released in North America on May 13, 2008, originally published by Navarre and later reissued by Storm City Games. The version was heavily panned by the gaming press, with an aggregate score of 43/100 on Metacritic. This version was again later re-released for Nintendo 3DS, published by Funbox Media in Europe, and Maximum Family Games in North America and Australia. The game later appeared in digital format via the Nintendo eShop in North America on November 15, 2012, and in Europe on September 5, 2013.

In February 2005, Cyan and Mean Hamster Software released Myst for the Microsoft Windows Mobile platform; Riven was ported shortly after. In August 2008, Cyan announced that the company was developing a version of Myst for Apple's iOS. The game was made available to download from the iTunes App Store on May 2, 2009. The original download size was 727 MB, which was considered very large by iPhone standards. An updated version of realMyst was released for iPad 2 and above, with improved graphics over the original PC release, on June 14, 2012. A version for Android devices based on the realMyst version was released on January 26, 2017, produced and published by Noodlecake, and a similar port for Riven was released on April 26, 2017.

realMyst: Masterpiece Edition was released for the Nintendo Switch on May 21, 2020.

3D remake for virtual reality and other platforms
Cyan announced a new remake of Myst for high-definition screens and virtual reality, with the game's worlds fully created in free-roam 3D environments, using Unreal Engine 4, along with features like puzzle randomization, in September 2020. Myst for the Oculus Quest and Oculus Quest 2 was released on December 10, 2020.

The VR version but adapted for "flatscreen" monitors was released on August 26, 2021 for Windows, macOS, Xbox Series X/S and Xbox One, and on February 9, 2023 for iOS.

See also 

 Choose-your-own-adventure and gamebook, books that allow the reader to choose a narrative line

Notes

References

External links 
 
 
 

1993 video games
3DO Interactive Multiplayer games
Acclaim Entertainment games
Amiga games
Amiga 1200 games
Android (operating system) games
Atari Jaguar CD games
Broderbund games
Cancelled Sega CD games
CD-i games
Cyan Worlds games
First-person adventure games
IOS games
Classic Mac OS games
Microcabin games
 Myst
Nintendo 3DS games
Nintendo 3DS eShop games
Nintendo DS games
Nintendo Switch games
PlayStation (console) games
PlayStation Network games
PlayStation Portable games
Psygnosis games
Puzzle video games
ScummVM-supported games
Sega Saturn games
Single-player video games
Sunsoft games
Unreal Engine games
Video games adapted into comics
Video games scored by Robyn Miller
Video games set on uninhabited islands
Video games with alternate endings
Video games set on fictional islands
Windows games
Empire Interactive games
Video games developed in the United States
Red Orb Entertainment games
Noodlecake Games games